The 2015 Indian Super League playoffs was the second playoffs series at the end of the Indian Super League season. The playoffs began on 11 December and culminated on 20 December with the final.

The final match was played between FC Goa & Chennaiyin FC at the Fatorda Stadium in Margao, Goa, where Chennaiyin beat Goa 3–2 to become the champions of the 2015 season.

Qualification

Bracket

Semi-finals
The first legs were played on 11 and 12 December, and the second legs were played on 15 and 16 December 2015. Due to massive floods in Chennai, the first leg of the semi-final between Atlético de Kolkata and Chennayin were played at Pune instead of Chennai.

|}

Leg 1

Leg 2

Final

See also
 2015–16 in Indian football
 2015–16 I-League

References

2015 Indian Super League season